The Northern Theater Command (is) one of the five theater commands of the People's Liberation Army, founded on 1 February 2016. Its predecessor is the Shenyang Military Region, Jinan Military Region and Beijing Military Region. Its headquarters is in the Heping District of Shenyang, Liaoning Province. The Northern Theater Command shares borders with North Korea, Russia and Mongolia.

Area of responsibility 
The Northern Theater Command's Area of Responsibility (AOR) consists of Mongolia, Russian Siberia, Korea and Japan, as well as the Bohai Bay, Yellow Sea and Sea of Japan.

Organizational structure 
The Northern Theater Command consists of the following components:
 Northern Theater Command Ground Force (North Sea Fleet), located at Jinan, Shandong
 78th Group Army (Harbin, Heilongjiang, formerly 16th Group Army);
 79th Group Army (Shenyang, Liaoning, formerly 39th Group Army);
 80th Group Army (Weifang, Shandong, formerly 26th Group Army).
 Northern Theater Command Navy, headquartered in Qingdao, Shandong.
 Huludao Naval Base
 Jianggezhuang Naval Base
 Lüshun Naval Base
 Dalian Base
 Yantai Base
 Yuchi Naval Base
 Northern Theater Command Air Force, headquartered at Shenyang, Liaoning.

Notes

External links 
 Jamestown Foundation, https://jamestown.org/program/strategic-assessment-chinas-northern-theater-command/

 
Theater commands of the People's Liberation Army
Military units and formations established in 2016
2016 establishments in China